The APG IV system of flowering plant classification is the fourth version of a modern, mostly molecular-based, system of plant taxonomy for flowering plants (angiosperms) being developed by the Angiosperm Phylogeny Group (APG). It was published in 2016, seven years after its predecessor the APG III system was published in 2009, and 18 years after the first APG system was published in 1998. In 2009, a linear arrangement of the system was published separately; the APG IV paper includes such an arrangement, cross-referenced to the 2009 one.

Compared to the APG III system, the APG IV system recognizes five new orders (Boraginales, Dilleniales, Icacinales, Metteniusales and Vahliales), along with some new families, making a total of 64 angiosperm orders and 416 families. In general, the authors describe their philosophy as "conservative", based on making changes from APG III only where "a well-supported need" has been demonstrated. This has sometimes resulted in placements that are not compatible with published studies, but where further research is needed before the classification can be changed.

Short version

Detailed version
Key to symbols used:
* = the family has been added or its circumscription changed since the APG III system of 2009
† = the order has been added since the APG III system

Basal angiosperms
 Amborellales Melikyan et al.
 Amborellaceae Pichon, nom. cons.
 Nymphaeales Salisb. ex Bercht. & J.Presl
 Hydatellaceae U.Hamann
 Cabombaceae Rich. ex A.Rich., nom. cons.
 Nymphaeaceae Salisb., nom. cons.
 Austrobaileyales Takht. ex Reveal
 Austrobaileyaceae Croizat, nom. cons.
 Trimeniaceae Gibbs, nom. cons.
 Schisandraceae Blume, nom. cons.

Magnoliids
 Canellales Cronq.
 Canellaceae Mart., nom. cons.
 Winteraceae R.Br. ex Lindl., nom. cons.
 Piperales Bercht. & J.Presl
 Saururaceae Rich. ex T.Lestib., nom. cons.
 Piperaceae Giseke, nom. cons.
 Aristolochiaceae Juss., nom. cons. * (including Asaraceae Vent., Hydnoraceae C.Agardh, nom. cons., Lactoridaceae Engl., nom. cons.)
 Magnoliales Juss. ex Bercht. & J.Presl
 Myristicaceae R.Br., nom. cons.
 Magnoliaceae Juss., nom. cons.
 Degeneriaceae I.W.Bailey & A.C.Sm., nom. cons.
 Himantandraceae Diels, nom. cons.
 Eupomatiaceae Orb., nom. cons.
 Annonaceae Juss., nom. cons.
 Laurales Juss. ex Bercht. & J.Presl
 Calycanthaceae Lindl., nom. cons.
 Siparunaceae Schodde
 Gomortegaceae Reiche, nom. cons.
 Atherospermataceae R.Br.
 Hernandiaceae Blume, nom. cons.
 Monimiaceae Juss., nom. cons.
 Lauraceae Juss., nom. cons.

Independent lineage: unplaced to more inclusive clade
 Chloranthales Mart.
 Chloranthaceae R.Br. ex Sims, nom. cons.

Monocots
 Acorales Mart.
 Acoraceae Martinov
 Alismatales R.Br. ex Bercht. & J.Presl
 Araceae Juss., nom. cons.
 Tofieldiaceae Takht.
 Alismataceae Vent., nom. cons.
 Butomaceae Mirb., nom. cons.
 Hydrocharitaceae Juss., nom. cons.
 Scheuchzeriaceae F.Rudolphi, nom. cons.
 Aponogetonaceae Planch., nom. cons.
 Juncaginaceae Rich., nom. cons. *
 Maundiaceae Nakai *
 Zosteraceae Dumort., nom. cons.
 Potamogetonaceae Bercht. & J.Presl, nom. cons
 Posidoniaceae Vines, nom. cons.
 Ruppiaceae Horan., nom. cons.
 Cymodoceaceae Vines, nom. cons.
 Petrosaviales Takht.
 Petrosaviaceae Hutch., nom. cons.
 Dioscoreales Mart.
 Nartheciaceae Fr. ex Bjurzon
 Burmanniaceae Blume, nom. cons. (not monophyletic.)
 Dioscoreaceae R.Br., nom. cons.
 Pandanales R.Br. ex Bercht. & J.Presl
 Triuridaceae Gardner, nom. cons.
 Velloziaceae J.Agardh, nom. cons.
 Stemonaceae Caruel, nom. cons.
 Cyclanthaceae Poit. ex A.Rich., nom. cons.
 Pandanaceae R.Br., nom. cons.
 Liliales Perleb
 Campynemataceae Dumort.
 Corsiaceae Becc., nom. cons.
 Melanthiaceae Batsch ex Borkh., nom. cons.
 Petermanniaceae Hutch, nom. cons.
 Alstroemeriaceae Dumort., nom. cons.
 Colchicaceae DC., nom. cons.
 Philesiaceae Dumort., nom. cons.
 Ripogonaceae Conran & Clifford
 Smilacaceae Vent., nom. cons.
 Liliaceae Juss., nom. cons.
 Asparagales Link
 Orchidaceae Juss., nom. cons.
 Boryaceae M.W.Chase et al.
 Blandfordiaceae R.Dahlgren & Clifford
 Asteliaceae Dumort.
 Lanariaceae H.Huber ex R.Dahlgren
 Hypoxidaceae R.Br., nom. cons.
 Doryanthaceae R.Dahlgren & Clifford
 Ixioliriaceae Nakai (as 'Ixiolirionaceae'; spelling corrected)
 Tecophilaeaceae Leyb., nom. cons.
 Iridaceae Juss., nom. cons.
 Xeronemataceae M.W.Chase et al.
 Asphodelaceae Juss., nom. cons. prop. (including Xanthorrhoeaceae Dumort., nom. cons.)
 Amaryllidaceae J.St.-Hil., nom. cons.
 Asparagaceae Juss., nom. cons.
 Arecales Bromhead
 Dasypogonaceae Dumort.
 Arecaceae Bercht. & J.Presl, nom. cons. (=Palmae Juss., nom. cons.)
 Commelinales Mirb. ex Bercht. & J.Presl
 Hanguanaceae Airy Shaw
 Commelinaceae Mirb., nom. cons.
 Philydraceae Link, nom. cons.
 Pontederiaceae Kunth, nom. cons.
 Haemodoraceae R.Br., nom. cons.
 Zingiberales Griseb.
 Strelitziaceae Hutch., nom. cons.
 Lowiaceae Ridl., nom. cons.
 Heliconiaceae Vines
 Musaceae Juss., nom. cons.
 Cannaceae Juss., nom. cons.
 Marantaceae R.Br., nom. cons.
 Costaceae Nakai
 Zingiberaceae Martinov, nom. cons.
 Poales Small
 Typhaceae Juss., nom. cons.
 Bromeliaceae Juss., nom. cons.
 Rapateaceae Dumort., nom. cons.
 Xyridaceae C.Agardh, nom. cons.
 Eriocaulaceae Martinov, nom. cons.
 Mayacaceae Kunth, nom. cons.
 Thurniaceae Engl., nom. cons.
 Juncaceae Juss., nom. cons.
 Cyperaceae Juss., nom. cons.
 Restionaceae R.Br., nom. cons. * (including Anarthriaceae D.W.Cutler & Airy Shaw, Centrolepidaceae Endl., nom. cons.)
 Flagellariaceae Dumort., nom. cons.
 Joinvilleaceae Toml. & A.C.Sm.
 Ecdeiocoleaceae D.W.Cutler & Airy Shaw
 Poaceae Barnhart, nom. cons. (= Gramineae Juss., nom. cons.)

Probable sister of eudicots
 Ceratophyllales Link
 Ceratophyllaceae Gray, nom. cons.

Eudicots
 Ranunculales Juss. ex Bercht. & J.Presl
 Eupteleaceae K.Wilh., nom. cons.
 Papaveraceae Juss., nom. cons.
 Circaeasteraceae Hutch., nom. cons.
 Lardizabalaceae R.Br., nom. cons.
 Menispermaceae Juss., nom. cons.
 Berberidaceae Juss., nom. cons.
 Ranunculaceae Juss., nom. cons.
 Proteales Juss. ex Bercht. & J.Presl
 Sabiaceae Blume, nom. cons.
 Nelumbonaceae A.Rich., nom. cons.
 Platanaceae T.Lestib., nom. cons.
 Proteaceae Juss., nom. cons.
 Trochodendrales Takht. ex Cronq.
 Trochodendraceae Eichler, nom. cons.
 Buxales Takht. ex Reveal
 Buxaceae Dumort., nom. cons. * (including Haptanthaceae C.Nelson)

Core eudicots
 Gunnerales Takht. ex Reveal
 Myrothamnaceae Nied., nom. cons.
 Gunneraceae Meisn., nom. cons.
 Dilleniales DC. ex Bercht. & J.Presl †
 Dilleniaceae Salisb., nom. cons.

Superrosids
 Saxifragales Bercht. & J.Presl
 Peridiscaceae Kuhlm., nom. cons.
 Paeoniaceae Raf., nom. cons.
 Altingiaceae Lindl., nom. cons.
 Hamamelidaceae R.Br., nom. cons.
 Cercidiphyllaceae Engl., nom. cons.
 Daphniphyllaceae Müll.Arg., nom. cons.
 Iteaceae J.Agardh, nom. cons.
 Grossulariaceae DC., nom. cons.
 Saxifragaceae Juss., nom. cons.
 Crassulaceae J.St.-Hil., nom. cons.
 Aphanopetalaceae Doweld
 Tetracarpaeaceae Nakai
 Penthoraceae Rydb. ex Britton, nom. cons.
 Haloragaceae R.Br., nom. cons.
 Cynomoriaceae Endl. ex Lindl., nom. cons.

Rosids
 Vitales Juss. ex Bercht. & J.Presl
 Vitaceae Juss., nom. cons.
 Zygophyllales Link
 Krameriaceae Dumort., nom. cons.
 Zygophyllaceae R.Br., nom. cons.
 Fabales Bromhead
 Quillajaceae D.Don
 Fabaceae Lindl., nom. cons. (= Leguminosae Juss., nom. cons.)
 Surianaceae Arn., nom. cons.
 Polygalaceae Hoffmanns. & Link, nom. cons.
 Rosales Bercht. & J.Presl
 Rosaceae Juss., nom. cons.
 Barbeyaceae Rendle, nom. cons.
 Dirachmaceae Hutch.
 Elaeagnaceae Juss., nom. cons.
 Rhamnaceae Juss., nom. cons.
 Ulmaceae Mirb., nom. cons.
 Cannabaceae Martinov, nom. cons.
 Moraceae Gaudich., nom. cons.
 Urticaceae Juss., nom. cons.
 Fagales Engl.
 Nothofagaceae Kuprian.
 Fagaceae Dumort., nom. cons.
 Myricaceae Rich. ex Kunth, nom. cons.
 Juglandaceae DC. ex Perleb, nom. cons.
 Casuarinaceae R.Br., nom. cons.
 Ticodendraceae Gomez-Laur. & L.D.Gomez
 Betulaceae Gray, nom. cons.
 Cucurbitales Juss. ex Bercht. & J.Presl
 Apodanthaceae Tiegh. ex Takht. *
 Anisophylleaceae Ridl.
 Corynocarpaceae Engl., nom. cons.
 Coriariaceae DC., nom. cons.
 Cucurbitaceae Juss., nom. cons.
 Tetramelaceae Airy Shaw
 Datiscaceae Dumort., nom. cons.
 Begoniaceae C.Agardh, nom. cons.

COM clade; placement uncertain
 Celastrales Link
 Lepidobotryaceae J. Leonard, nom. cons.
 Celastraceae R.Br., nom. cons.
 Oxalidales Bercht. & J.Presl
 Huaceae A.Chev.
 Connaraceae R.Br., nom. cons.
 Oxalidaceae R.Br., nom. cons.
 Cunoniaceae R.Br., nom. cons.
 Elaeocarpaceae Juss., nom. cons.
 Cephalotaceae Dumort., nom. cons.
 Brunelliaceae Engl., nom. cons.
 Malpighiales Juss. ex Bercht. & J.Presl
 Pandaceae Engl. & Gilg, nom. cons.
 Irvingiaceae Exell & Mendonça, nom. cons. * (including Allantospermum Forman)
 Ctenolophonaceae Exell & Mendonça
 Rhizophoraceae Pers., nom. cons.
 Erythroxylaceae Kunth, nom. cons.
 Ochnaceae DC., nom. cons.
 Bonnetiaceae L.Beauvis. ex Nakai
 Clusiaceae Lindl., nom. cons. (= Guttiferae Juss., nom. cons.)
 Calophyllaceae J.Agardh
 Podostemaceae Rich. ex Kunth, nom. cons.
 Hypericaceae Juss., nom. cons.
 Caryocaraceae Voigt, nom. cons.
 Lophopyxidaceae H.Pfeiff.
 Putranjivaceae Meisn.
 Centroplacaceae Doweld & Reveal
 Elatinaceae Dumort., nom. cons.
 Malpighiaceae Juss., nom. cons.
 Balanopaceae Benth. & Hook.f., nom. cons.
 Trigoniaceae A.Juss., nom. cons.
 Dichapetalaceae Baill., nom. cons.
 Euphroniaceae Marc.-Berti
 Chrysobalanaceae R.Br., nom. cons.
 Humiriaceae A.Juss., nom. cons.
 Achariaceae Harms, nom. cons.
 Violaceae Batsch, nom. cons.
 Goupiaceae Miers
 Passifloraceae Juss. ex Roussel, nom. cons.
 Lacistemataceae Mart., nom. cons.
 Salicaceae Mirb., nom. cons.
 Peraceae Klotzsch *
 Rafflesiaceae Dumort., nom. cons.
 Euphorbiaceae Juss., nom. cons. *
 Linaceae DC. ex Perleb, nom. cons.
 Ixonanthaceae Planch. ex Miq., nom. cons. *
 Picrodendraceae Small, nom. cons.
 Phyllanthaceae Martinov, nom. cons.

Rosids continued
 Geraniales Juss. ex Bercht. & J.Presl
 Geraniaceae Juss., nom. cons.
 Francoaceae A.Juss., nom. cons. * (including Bersamaceae Doweld, Greyiaceae Hutch., nom. cons., Ledocarpaceae Meyen, Melianthaceae Horan., nom. cons., Rhynchothecaceae A.Juss., Vivianiaceae Klotzsch, nom. cons.)
 Myrtales Juss. ex Bercht. & J.Presl
 Combretaceae R.Br., nom. cons.
 Lythraceae J.St.-Hil., nom. cons.
 Onagraceae Juss., nom. cons.
 Vochysiaceae A.St.-Hil., nom. cons.
 Myrtaceae Juss., nom. cons.
 Melastomataceae Juss., nom. cons.
 Crypteroniaceae A.DC., nom. cons.
 Alzateaceae S.A.Graham
 Penaeaceae Sweet ex Guill., nom. cons.
 Crossosomatales Takht. ex Reveal
 Aphloiaceae Takht.
 Geissolomataceae A.DC., nom. cons.
 Strasburgeriaceae Tiegh., nom. cons.
 Staphyleaceae Martinov, nom. cons.
 Guamatelaceae S.H.Oh & D.Potter
 Stachyuraceae J.Agardh, nom. cons.
 Crossosomataceae Engl., nom. cons.
 Picramniales Doweld
 Picramniaceae Fernando & Quinn
 Huerteales Doweld
 Gerrardinaceae M.H.Alford
 Petenaeaceae Christenh. et al. *
 Tapisciaceae Takht.
 Dipentodontaceae Merr., nom. cons.
 Sapindales Juss. ex Bercht. & J.Presl
 Biebersteiniaceae Schnizl.
 Nitrariaceae Lindl.
 Kirkiaceae Takht.
 Burseraceae Kunth, nom. cons.
 Anacardiaceae R.Br., nom. cons.
 Sapindaceae Juss., nom. cons. (including Xanthocerataceae Buerki et al., as 'Xanthoceraceae')
 Rutaceae Juss., nom. cons.
 Simaroubaceae DC., nom. cons.
 Meliaceae Juss., nom. cons.
 Malvales Juss. ex Bercht. & J.Presl
 Cytinaceae A.Rich.
 Muntingiaceae C.Bayer et al.
 Neuradaceae Kostel., nom. cons.
 Malvaceae Juss., nom. cons.
 Sphaerosepalaceae Bullock
 Thymelaeaceae Juss., nom. cons.
 Bixaceae Kunth, nom. cons.
 Cistaceae Juss., nom. cons. * (including Pakaraimaea Maguire & P.S.Ashton)
 Sarcolaenaceae Caruel, nom. cons.
 Dipterocarpaceae Blume, nom. cons. *
 Brassicales Bromhead
 Akaniaceae Stapf, nom. cons.
 Tropaeolaceae Juss. ex DC., nom. cons.
 Moringaceae Martinov, nom. cons.
 Caricaceae Dumort., nom. cons.
 Limnanthaceae R.Br., nom. cons.
 Setchellanthaceae Iltis
 Koeberliniaceae Engl., nom. cons.
 Bataceae Mart. ex Perleb, nom. cons.
 Salvadoraceae Lindl., nom. cons.
 Emblingiaceae Airy Shaw
 Tovariaceae Pax, nom. cons.
 Pentadiplandraceae Hutch. & Dalziel
 Gyrostemonaceae A.Juss., nom. cons.
 Resedaceae Martinov, nom. cons. * (including Borthwickiaceae J.X.Su et al., Stixidaceae Doweld as 'Stixaceae', Forchhammeria Liebm.)
 Capparaceae Juss., nom. cons. *
 Cleomaceae Bercht. & J.Presl
 Brassicaceae Burnett, nom. cons. (= Cruciferae Juss., nom. cons.)

Superasterids
 Berberidopsidales Doweld
 Aextoxicaceae Engl. & Gilg, nom. cons.
 Berberidopsidaceae Takht.
 Santalales R.Br. ex Bercht. & J.Presl
 Olacaceae R.Br., nom. cons. (not monophyletic; including Aptandraceae Miers, Coulaceae Tiegh., Erythropalaceae Planch. ex Miq., nom. cons., Octoknemaceae Soler. nom. cons., Strombosiaceae Tiegh., Ximeniaceae Horan.)
 Opiliaceae Valeton, nom. cons.
 Balanophoraceae Rich., nom. cons.
 Santalaceae R.Br., nom. cons. (not monophyletic if Balanophoraceae are embedded; including Amphorogynaceae Nickrent & Der, Cervantesiaceae Nickrent & Der, Comandraceae Nickrent & Der, Nanodeaceae Nickrent & Der, Thesiaceae Vest, Viscaceae Batsch)
 Misodendraceae J.Agardh, nom. cons.
 Schoepfiaceae Blume
 Loranthaceae Juss., nom. cons.
 Caryophyllales Juss. ex Bercht. & J.Presl
 Frankeniaceae Desv., nom. cons.
 Tamaricaceae Link, nom. cons.
 Plumbaginaceae Juss., nom. cons.
 Polygonaceae Juss., nom. cons.
 Droseraceae Salisb., nom. cons.
 Nepenthaceae Dumort, nom. cons.
 Drosophyllaceae Chrtek et al.
 Dioncophyllaceae Airy Shaw, nom. cons.
 Ancistrocladaceae Planch. ex Walp., nom. cons.
 Rhabdodendraceae Prance
 Simmondsiaceae Tiegh.
 Physenaceae Takht.
 Asteropeiaceae Takht. ex Reveal & Hoogland
 Macarthuriaceae Christenh. *
 Microteaceae Schäferhoff & Borsch *
 Caryophyllaceae Juss., nom. cons.
 Achatocarpaceae Heimerl, nom. cons.
 Amaranthaceae Juss., nom. cons.
 Stegnospermataceae Nakai
 Limeaceae Shipunov ex Reveal *
 Lophiocarpaceae Doweld & Reveal
 Kewaceae Christenh. *
 Barbeuiaceae Nakai
 Gisekiaceae Nakai
 Aizoaceae Martinov, nom. cons.
 Phytolaccaceae R.Br., nom. cons. *
 Petiveriaceae C.Agardh * (including Rivinaceae C.Agardh)
 Sarcobataceae Behnke
 Nyctaginaceae Juss., nom. cons.
 Molluginaceae Bartl., nom. cons. *
 Montiaceae Raf.
 Didiereaceae Radlk., nom. cons.
 Basellaceae Raf., nom. cons.
 Halophytaceae S.Soriano
 Talinaceae Doweld
 Portulacaceae Juss., nom. cons.
 Anacampserotaceae Eggli & Nyffeler
 Cactaceae Juss., nom. cons.

Asterids
 Cornales Link
 Nyssaceae Juss. ex Dumort., nom. cons.
 Hydrostachyaceae Engl., nom. cons.
 Hydrangeaceae Dumort., nom. cons.
 Loasaceae Juss., nom. cons.
 Curtisiaceae Takht.
 Grubbiaceae Endl. ex Meisn., nom. cons.
 Cornaceae Bercht. & J.Presl, nom. cons.
 Ericales Bercht. & J.Presl
 Balsaminaceae A.Rich., nom. cons.
 Marcgraviaceae Bercht. & J.Presl, nom. cons.
 Tetrameristaceae Hutch.
 Fouquieriaceae DC., nom. cons.
 Polemoniaceae Juss., nom. cons.
 Lecythidaceae A.Rich., nom. cons.
 Sladeniaceae Airy Shaw
 Pentaphylacaceae Engl., nom. cons.
 Sapotaceae Juss., nom. cons.
 Ebenaceae Gürke, nom. cons.
 Primulaceae Batsch ex Borkh., nom. cons.
 Theaceae Mirb., nom. cons.
 Symplocaceae Desf., nom. cons.
 Diapensiaceae Lindl., nom. cons.
 Styracaceae DC. & Spreng., nom. cons.
 Sarraceniaceae Dumort., nom. cons.
 Roridulaceae Martinov, nom. cons.
 Actinidiaceae Gilg & Werderm., nom. cons.
 Clethraceae Klotzsch, nom. cons.
 Cyrillaceae Lindl., nom. cons.
 Ericaceae Juss., nom. cons.
 Mitrastemonaceae Makino, nom. cons. (placement in order unclear)
 Icacinales Tiegh. †
 Oncothecaceae Kobuski ex Airy Shaw
 Icacinaceae Miers, nom. cons. *
 Metteniusales Takht. †
 Metteniusaceae H.Karst. ex Schnizl. *
 Garryales Mart.
 Eucommiaceae Engl., nom. cons.
 Garryaceae Lindl., nom. cons.
 Gentianales Juss. ex Bercht. & J.Presl
 Rubiaceae Juss., nom. cons.
 Gentianaceae Juss., nom. cons.
 Loganiaceae R.Br. ex Mart., nom. cons.
 Gelsemiaceae L.Struwe & V.A.Albert * (including Pteleocarpaceae Brummitt)
 Apocynaceae Juss., nom. cons.
 Boraginales Juss. ex Bercht. & J.Presl †
 Boraginaceae Juss., nom. cons. (including Codonaceae Weigend & Hilger)
 Vahliales Doweld †
 Vahliaceae Dandy
 Solanales Juss. ex Bercht. & J.Presl
 Convolvulaceae Juss., nom. cons.
 Solanaceae Juss., nom. cons.
 Montiniaceae Nakai, nom. cons.
 Sphenocleaceae T.Baskerv., nom. cons.
 Hydroleaceae R.Br.
 Lamiales Bromhead
 Plocospermataceae Hutch.
 Carlemanniaceae Airy Shaw
 Oleaceae Hoffmanns. & Link, nom. cons.
 Tetrachondraceae Wettst.
 Calceolariaceae Olmstead
 Gesneriaceae Rich. & Juss., nom. cons. * (the position of Peltanthera Benth. is problematic and here considered unplaced to family)
 Plantaginaceae Juss., nom. cons.
 Scrophulariaceae Juss., nom. cons.
 Stilbaceae Kunth, nom. cons.
 Linderniaceae Borsch et al.
 Byblidaceae Domin, nom. cons.
 Martyniaceae Horan., nom. cons.
 Pedaliaceae R.Br., nom. cons.
 Acanthaceae Juss., nom. cons.
 Bignoniaceae Juss., nom. cons.
 Lentibulariaceae Rich., nom. cons.
 Schlegeliaceae Reveal
 Thomandersiaceae Sreem.
 Verbenaceae J.St.Hil., nom. cons.
 Lamiaceae Martinov, nom. cons. (= Labiatae Juss., nom. cons.)
 Mazaceae Reveal
 Phrymaceae Schauer, nom. cons. *
 Paulowniaceae Nakai
 Orobanchaceae Vent., nom. cons. * (including Lindenbergiaceae Doweld, Rehmanniaceae Reveal)
 Aquifoliales Senft
 Stemonuraceae Kårehed
 Cardiopteridaceae Blume, nom. cons.
 Phyllonomaceae Small
 Helwingiaceae Decne.
 Aquifoliaceae Bercht. & J.Presl, nom. cons.
 Asterales Link
 Rousseaceae DC.
 Campanulaceae Juss., nom. cons.
 Pentaphragmataceae J.Agardh, nom. cons.
 Stylidiaceae R.Br., nom. cons.
 Alseuosmiaceae Airy Shaw
 Phellinaceae Takht.
 Argophyllaceae Takht.
 Menyanthaceae Dumort., nom. cons.
 Goodeniaceae R.Br., nom. cons.
 Calyceraceae R.Br. ex Rich., nom. cons.
 Asteraceae Bercht. & J.Presl, nom. cons. (= Compositae Giseke, nom. cons.)
 Escalloniales Link
 Escalloniaceae R.Br. ex Dumort., nom. cons.
 Bruniales Dumort.
 Columelliaceae D.Don, nom. cons.
 Bruniaceae R.Br. ex DC., nom. cons.
 Paracryphiales Takht. ex Reveal
 Paracryphiaceae Airy Shaw
 Dipsacales Juss. ex Bercht. & J.Presl
 Adoxaceae E.Mey., nom. cons. (= Viburnaceae Raf., nom. cons. prop.)
 Caprifoliaceae Juss., nom. cons.
 Apiales Nakai
 Pennantiaceae J.Agardh
 Torricelliaceae Hu
 Griseliniaceae Takht., nom. cons. prop.
 Pittosporaceae R.Br., nom. cons.
 Araliaceae Juss., nom. cons.
 Myodocarpaceae Doweld
 Apiaceae Lindl., nom. cons. (= Umbelliferae Juss., nom. cons.)

Phylogeny
Like the earlier APG systems, the APG IV revision is based on a phylogenetic tree for the angiosperms, as shown below.

References

Bibliography 

 
 
 
 
 

APG 04
2016 in science
2016 introductions